Maria Stamatoula (born 15 August 1972) is a Paralympian athlete from Greece competing mainly in F32 shot put and club throw events.

She competed in the 2008 Summer Paralympics in Beijing, China. There she won a bronze medal in the women's F32-34/52-53 shot put event. In the 2011 IPC Athletics World Championships she won a silver medal in the Women's Shot Put event, and broke the previous F32 world record in shot put.

References

External links
 

Paralympic athletes of Greece
Athletes (track and field) at the 2008 Summer Paralympics
Paralympic bronze medalists for Greece
1972 births
Living people
World record holders in Paralympic athletics
Medalists at the 2008 Summer Paralympics
Paralympic medalists in athletics (track and field)
Greek female shot putters
21st-century Greek women